Mahonia shenii is a shrub in the Berberidaceae described as a species in 1928. It is endemic to China, found in the provinces of Guangdong, Guangxi, Guizhou, and Hunan.

The species is named for Professor P.F. Shen of Sun Yatsen University in Canton (Guangzhou).

References

External links

shenii
Plants described in 1928
Endemic flora of China